How He Fell in Love is a 2015 American romantic drama film written and directed by Marc Meyers and starring Matt McGorry, Amy Hargreaves, Britne Oldford, and Mark Blum. It premiered at the LA Film Fest on June 11, 2015 and was released theatrically by Orion Pictures and Monument Releasing on July 15, 2016.

Synopsis
The film revolves around Travis (McGorry), a young struggling musician, who crosses paths with Ellen (Hargreaves) at a wedding. She's an older married yoga teacher who is trying to adopt a child with her husband. Travis and Ellen begin an affair that slowly deepens into something more intimate and profound. As their encounters continue, Ellen is confronted with her failing marriage while Travis must face the consequences of his actions.

Cast
 Matt McGorry as Travis
 Amy Hargreaves as Ellen
 Mark Blum as Henry
 Britne Oldford as Monica
 Bobby Moreno as Jason
 Seth Barrish as Steve
 Denny Bess as Ian
 Turna Mete as Karen

Production
Myers revisited a previous draft of the script after completing his previous film, Harvest (2010), as he felt that after several years of marriage, it was time to return to the story and explore a type of intimacy that he never put on screen before.

Reception
The film received mixed reviews from critics, currently holding a 38% "Rotten" rating on Rotten Tomatoes. Nick Schager of Variety was positive about the film, saying that it was "Mature and moving in its navigation of convoluted, conflicting desires." Bob Strauss of the Los Angeles Daily News wrote that "It's the type of mature drama that's rarely seen in American movies -- even the indie ones." Steve Greene of Indiewire also wrote positively of the film, praising Amy Hargreaves' performance and saying that "With a sharp focus...Meyers foregoes easy judgment or condemnation to give a full view of a love with consequences."

References

External links
 
 

2015 independent films
2015 films
American independent films
Films shot in New York City
American romantic drama films
Orion Pictures films
Films directed by Marc Meyers
2010s English-language films
2010s American films